The battle of Gueltat Zemmur occurred between 13 and 29 October 1981 when Polisario Front attacked the very small Moroccan garrison at Guelta Zemmur in Western Sahara. Using heavy military equipment including tanks and surface-to-air missiles, the Polisario Front defeated the Moroccan garrison forces entrenched around the town. Three Moroccan planes were shot down, including a C-130 Hercules. Moroccan armed forces then aggressively counterattacked and drove the Polisario out of the town, causing significant casualties in the Polisario side.

References 

Guelta Zemmur
Guelta Zemmur
1981 in Western Sahara